The Department of the Environment (DOE or DOENI; ; Ulster-Scots: Männystrie o tha Kintraside) was a devolved Northern Irish government department in the Northern Ireland Executive.  The minister with overall responsibility for the department was the Minister for the Environment.

Aim
The DOE's overall aim was to "work in partnership" with the public, private and voluntary sectors to promote the "economic and social welfare of the community" through "promoting sustainable
development and seeking to secure a better and safer environment for everyone".

The last Minister was Mark H. Durkan (Social Democratic and Labour Party).

Responsibilities
The main policy responsibilities of the department were:
 the natural environment
 the built environment
 land use planning
 road safety
 regulation of drivers, vehicles and vehicle operators
 local government

The DOE's main counterparts in the United Kingdom Government were:
 the Department for Environment, Food and Rural Affairs (Defra);
 the Department for Communities and Local Government;
 the Department for Transport;
 the Department for Culture, Media and Sport (on built heritage).

In the Irish Government, its main counterparts were:
 the Department of the Environment, Community and Local Government; and
 the Department of Transport, Tourism and Sport.

History

The Ministry of Home Affairs was established on the formation of Northern Ireland in June 1921 and was responsible for a range of non-economic domestic matters, including local government.  A separate Ministry of Health and Local Government was formed in 1944 and was subsequently split in 1965, to create the Ministry of Development.  An environment ministry existed in the 1974 Northern Ireland Executive and the ministry was known as the Department of the Environment under direct rule.

The DoE is still a phrase used in everyday language in Northern Ireland to describe the Roads Service, which was once run by the department but is currently an agency of the separate Department for Regional Development.

Following a referendum on the Belfast Agreement on 23 May 1998 and the granting of royal assent to the Northern Ireland Act 1998 on 19 November 1998, a Northern Ireland Assembly and Northern Ireland Executive were established by the United Kingdom Government under Prime Minister Tony Blair. The process was known as devolution and was set up to return devolved legislative powers to Northern Ireland. DoE was therefore one of the six direct rule Northern Ireland departments that continued in existence after devolution in December 1999 by the Northern Ireland Act 1998 and The Departments (Northern Ireland) Order 1999.

A devolved minister first took office on 2 December 1999.  Devolution was suspended for four periods, during which the department came under the responsibility of direct rule ministers from the Northern Ireland Office:
 between 12 February 2000 and 30 May 2000;
 on 11 August 2001;
 on 22 September 2001;
 between 15 October 2002 and 8 May 2007.

Since 8 May 2007, devolution has operated without interruption.

Ministers of the Environment

Direct rule ministers 
During the periods of suspension, the following ministers of the Northern Ireland Office were responsible for the department:

George Howarth (2000)
Angela Smith (2002–05)
Lord Rooker (2005–06)
David Cairns (2006–07)

See also 
Committee for the Environment

References

External links 

 Department of Environment web site
  

Northern Ireland Executive
Environment of Northern Ireland
Environment ministries
Northern Ireland